Philadelphia Hospital & School of Nursing, Ambala comprises two sisterly organisations; Philadelphia Hospital, Ambala & Philadelphia School of Nursing, Ambala these institutes provide community health and education.

History
The hospital was opened in 1901 by Dr Jessica Carlton, an American missionary from Philadelphia, USA, who came to Ambala in 1887.

Philadelphia School of Nursing, Ambala is sister organisation of Philadelphia Hospital, Ambala. School of Nursing is a pioneering institute of medical training in India.
School of Nursing was established in 1924. In the beginning it had a nursing staff of one trained American nurse and ten Indian trainees. The first batch of nurses - when medical care for women was almost unheard of except for the traditional mid-wives - were trained in General nursing, Anatomy, Physiology and Mid-wifery. 
School of Nursing is recognized by Indian Nursing Council and Haryana Nursing Council.

Diploma Courses

References

Ambala
Hospitals in Haryana
Nursing schools in India